Homs District is a district of the Homs Governorate in central Syria. The administrative centre is the city of Homs.

The district was split in 2010, when three sub-districts were separated to form the new Taldou District. At the 2004 census, the remaining sub-districts had a total population of 945,299.

Sub-districts
The district of Homs is divided into ten sub-districts or nawāḥī (population as of 2004):
Homs Subdistrict (ناحية حمص): population 750,501.
Khirbet Tin Nur Subdistrict (ناحية خربة تين نور): population 52,879.
Ayn al-Niser Subdistrict (ناحية عين النسر): population 30,267.
Furqlus Subdistrict (ناحية الفرقلس): population 13,506.
Al-Riqama Subdistrict (ناحية رقاما): population 20,602.
Al-Qaryatayn Subdistrict (ناحية القريتين): population 16,795.
Mahin Subdistrict (ناحية مهين): population 13,511.
Hisyah Subdistrict (ناحية حسياء): population 15,195.
Sadad Subdistrict (ناحية صدد): population 4,092.
Shin Subdistrict (ناحية شين): population 27,951.

References

 

 
Districts of Homs Governorate